The Ninth Van Cliburn International Piano Competition took place in Fort Worth, Texas from May 22 to June 6, 1993. Italian pianist Simone Pedroni won the competition, while Valery Kuleshov and Christopher Taylor were awarded the Silver and bronze medals.

Morton Gould composed his Ghost Waltzes for the competition.

Jurors

  John Giordano (chairman)
  Joaquín Achúcarro
  Philippe Entremont
  Claude Frank
  Nelson Freire
  Edward Gordon
  Moura Lympany
  Lev Naumov
  Cécile Ousset
  John Pfeiffer
  Menahem Pressler
  Abbey Simon
  Takahiro Sonoda
  Ralph Votapek

Results

References

Van Cliburn International Piano Competition